Jason McCoy (born Jason Dwight Campsall on August 27, 1970) is a Canadian country singer-songwriter.

He has won the 2001 Male Vocalist of the Year at the Canadian Country Music Awards, 3 SOCAN Song of the Year awards, 19 CCMA nominations and 5 Juno nominations (all for Best Country Male Vocalist). He also won six awards at the 2004 Ontario Country Performer and Fan Association awards. In 2006, he was awarded the Global Artist Award at the CMA Awards in Nashville.

McCoy was also one of the three members of the group The Road Hammers, which has released two studio albums, in addition to charting four singles in Canada and one in the United States before parting ways in 2010. The group later reunited in 2013.

Biography 
McCoy was born in Barrie, Ontario and was raised for a time in Camrose, Alberta before his family settled in Anten Mills, Ontario. At around the age of 5, his family moved to Camrose, Alberta, returning three years later. "The cowboy culture really stuck with me. I just fell in love with the music. For some reason, as a little kid, I had some sort of connection with these guys who were singing about these depressing things," McCoy said, citing Merle Haggard and Johnny Cash to lesser known artists like Ed Bruce and Wynn Stewart. "I just didn't have a voice for rock 'n' roll." Jason started playing guitar at age 7 and wrote his first song when he was 12.

In his teens, McCoy owned an electric guitar and was partial to AC/DC. In the 1980s, he joined a band called Three Quarter Country, which performed at legion halls, Saturday night dances, and clubs in Barrie, Midland, Orillia and other small towns. McCoy won a talent contest in Barrie, Ontario where he was discovered by country music writer Henry McGuirk who later became his manager and arranged for him to travel to Nashville to record an album with producer Ray Griff. He later signed with MCA Records in 1995.

On May 1, 1999, McCoy married his longtime girlfriend Terrine Barnes. The couple have two children.

McCoy was a member of the country-rock group The Road Hammers from 2005 to 2010, which also featured musicians Clayton Bellamy and Chris Byrne, and earlier, Corbett Frasz. His first album in seven years, the live Christmas at the Grand, was released on November 2, 2010, while his first studio album in eight years, Everything, was released on March 1, 2011.

In 2017, McCoy began a radio career on KICX 106 in Orillia, Ontario while continuing his music career. After KICX was purchased by iheartradio, McCoy also began hosting syndicated programming across the Pure Country Network.

Discography

Studio albums

Compilation albums

Singles

1980s and 1990s

2000s and 2010s 

Notes
A^ "Kind of Like It's Love" peaked at number 3 on the Canadian RPM Country Tracks chart.

Music videos

Awards 
 6 2004 OCPFA Awards
 1 Gold album (Playin' for Keeps)
 19 CCMA Award Nominations
 5 time Juno Award Male Country Vocalist of the Year Nominee
 Global Artist of the Year in 2006 for the CMA Awards

References

External links
 Official Site
 The Road Hammers Official

1970 births
Living people
Canadian country singer-songwriters
Canadian male singer-songwriters
Open Road Recordings artists
MCA Records artists
Musicians from Barrie
Canadian Country Music Association Male Artist of the Year winners
Canadian Country Music Association Song of the Year winners
21st-century Canadian male singers